Gaal may refer to:

People
Gaal (biblical figure)
Béla Gaál (1893–1945), Hungarian film director
Franciska Gaal (1904–1973), Hungarian actress
Gaszton Gaál (1868–1932), Hungarian landowner, ornithologist and politician
István Gaál (1933–2007), Hungarian film director
Lisl Gaal (born 1924), Austrian-born American mathematician, married to Steven
Miklos Gaál (born 1974), Finnish photographer 
Miklós Gaál (born 1981), Hungarian footballer 
Pieter Gaal (1769/70–1819), Dutch painter
Sándor Gaál (1885–1972), Hungarian physicist
Steven Gaal (1924–2016), Hungarian–American mathematician, married to Lisl
Louis van Gaal (born 1951), Dutch former football manager and player

Places
Gaal, Austria
Gaal (state constituency), Kelantan, Malaysia

Literature
Gaal Dornick, fictional character in Isaac Asimov's Foundation series